The Niagara Escarpment is a long escarpment, or cuesta, in   Canada and the United States that runs predominantly east–west from New York through Ontario, Michigan, Wisconsin, and into Illinois. The escarpment is most famous as the cliff over which the Niagara River plunges at Niagara Falls, for which it is named. 
 
The escarpment is a UNESCO World Biosphere Reserve. The reserve has the oldest forest ecosystem and trees in eastern North America.

The escarpment is not a fault line but the result of unequal erosion. It is composed of an outcrop belt of the Lockport Formation of Silurian age, and is similar to the Onondaga Formation, which runs in a parallel outcrop belt just to the south, through western New York and southern Ontario. The escarpment is the most prominent of several escarpments formed in the bedrock of the Great Lakes Basin. From its easternmost point near Watertown, New York, the escarpment shapes in part the individual basins and landforms of Lake Ontario, Lake Huron, and Lake Michigan.

In Rochester, New York, the Genesee River flows through the city in three waterfalls over the scarp face. The escarpment thence runs westward to the Niagara River, forming a deep gorge north of Niagara Falls, which itself cascades over the scarp face. In southern Ontario, it spans the Niagara Peninsula, closely following the Lake Ontario shore through the cities of St. Catharines and Hamilton, where it takes a sharp turn north in the town of Milton toward Georgian Bay. It then follows the Georgian Bay shore northwestwards to form the spine of the Bruce Peninsula and Manitoulin Island, as well as several smaller islands in northern Lake Huron, where it turns westwards into the Upper Peninsula of northern Michigan, south of Sault Ste. Marie. It extends down the Garden Peninsula and Potawatomi Islands into Wisconsin following the Door Peninsula and then continues more inland from the western coast of Lake Michigan until ending northwest of Chicago near the Wisconsin–Illinois border.

Formation 

Study of rock exposures and drillholes demonstrates that no displacement of the rock layers occurs at the escarpment, which is not a fault line but the result of unequal erosion. The escarpment's caprock is dolomitic limestone, also known as dolostone, which is more resistant and overlies weaker, more easily eroded shale as a weathering-resistant "cap". The escarpment formed over millions of years through a process of differential erosion of these rocks of different hardnesses. Through time the soft rocks weather away or erode by the action of streams. The gradual removal of the soft rocks undercuts the resistant caprock, leaving a cliff or escarpment. The erosional process is most readily seen at Niagara Falls, where the river has quickened the process. It can also be seen at the three waterfalls of the Genesee River at Rochester (additional resistant rock layers make more than one escarpment in some places). Also, in some places thick glacial deposits, such as the Oak Ridges Moraine, conceal the Niagara Escarpment, such as north of Georgetown, Ontario, where it actually continues under glacial till and reappears farther north.

The dolomite cap was laid down as sediment on the floor of a marine environment. In Michigan, behind (southwest of) the escarpment, the cuesta capstone slopes gently to form a wide basin, the floor of an Ordovician-Silurian-age tropical sea. (The escarpment is essentially the remnant shoreline of that sea.) There the constant deposition of minute shells and fragments of biologically-generated calcium carbonate, mixed with sediment washed in by erosion of the virtually lifeless landmasses, eventually formed a limestone layer. During the Silurian period, some magnesium substituted for some of the calcium in the carbonates, slowly forming harder dolomite layers in the same fashion. Worldwide sea levels were at their all-time maximum in the Ordovician; as the sea retreated, erosion inevitably began.

This dolomite basin contains Lakes Michigan, Huron, and Erie. (The geological formations under Lakes Superior and Ontario were formed from volcanic rifts along the Midcontinent Rift System. Soft basalt lines their canyon walls, bottoming at around 400 metres (1300 feet) below sea level.)

Human geography 

The Welland Canal allows ships to traverse the escarpment between Lake Erie and Lake Ontario on the Niagara Peninsula of Ontario. The escarpment was a major obstacle in the construction of the Erie Canal in New York and was traversed by a series of locks; the community which grew up at the site thus became known as Lockport, New York.

In southern Ontario, the Bruce Trail runs the length of the escarpment from Queenston on the Niagara River to Tobermory on the Bruce Peninsula. Highway 401, Canada's busiest, also crosses the Niagara Escarpment, beginning its long descent through rolling hills, farmland, and towns west of Milton. Rock exposed on the face of the escarpment can be seen along Highway 26 from Owen Sound eastwards towards Meaford, Ontario.

Hamilton, Ontario, is on the escarpment in such a way that the north end of the city is below and the south part above. Commonly referred to as "The Mountain" by its residents, many roads or "mountain accesses" join the urban core below with the suburban expansion above. From 1892 to 1936, the Hamilton Incline Railway transported people up and down "The Mountain".

High Cliff State Park in Wisconsin shows how modern and prehistoric humans used the escarpment for not only cultural reasons, but economic gains, as well. A number of different animal and geometric effigy mounds and the remains of an early 20th-century limestone quarry and kiln are within the park.

The relief and exposed edge are used by several wind farms stretching from Pipe, to Brownsville in Wisconsin. Wind speeds average 18 mph (about 29 km/h) along this stretch.

The Niagara Escarpment is a prominent Wisconsin feature in Dodge County, southwest of Fond du Lac, Wisconsin; it is known there as "The Ledge" and is in Ledge County Park between Horicon and Mayville, Wisconsin. Some local organizations take their name from it, including The Ledgers, the sports teams at St. Mary's Springs Academy, which is perched on the side of the escarpment.

Many resorts and ski areas in Ontario, Michigan, Wisconsin, and New York are along the escarpment.

Vineyard land 
Niagara County, New York, near the eastern end of the escarpment, is the site of the  Niagara Escarpment AVA (American Viticultural Area).  Wines produced in this region include traditional grape varieties such as Merlot, Cabernet Franc, Cabernet Sauvignon, Chardonnay, and Riesling, and fruit wines.

Ontario's Niagara Peninsula is the site of the largest wine-producing appellation (region) in Canada. Cool-climate varieties such as Riesling, Chardonnay, Gamay Noir, Pinot Noir, and Cabernet Franc are among the more than 30 varietals produced across . Three subappellations lie along the benchlands of the Niagara Escarpment: Short Hills Bench, Twenty Mile Bench, and Beamsville Bench.

Northeastern Wisconsin, at the western end of the escarpment, is the site of the  Wisconsin Ledge AVA.  Most of the region's vineyards lie upon the escarpment's eastern-facing slope that rises gently upward from the shores of Lake Michigan to the top of the Ledge, before dropping sharply off into Green Bay, and benefit greatly from constant air movement from Lake Michigan, which stores warmth during the summer. The presence of the lake produces a vacuum of sorts during the growing season: warm air over the lake rises, sucking colder air off the land and creating offshore breezes. Cold air cannot settle over the vineyards and a constant flow of warmer air makes the growing season here longer than in other parts of the state. The escarpment's glacial soils are made up of gravel, sand, and clay over limestone bedrock. An aquifer provides mineral-rich ground water to the vines, encouraging deep root growth.

World Biosphere Reserve 

In February 1990, the Niagara Escarpment was a designated World Biosphere Reserve by UNESCO, making it one of 12 in Canada. Development and land use on and adjacent to the escarpment is regulated by the Niagara Escarpment Commission, an agency of the Ontario government.

Cliffs along the scarp face have the oldest forest ecosystem in eastern North America. The oldest tree in Ontario is an eastern white cedar from 688 A.D.. The oldest known tree in Wisconsin, a 1,300 year-old eastern white cedar, was found in Brown County.

See also 
 Bayshore Blufflands
 Bruce Trail
 Canadian Shield
 Cheltenham Badlands
 Ontario Greenbelt
 Golden Horseshoe
 Manitoulin Island
 Michigan Basin
 Oak Ridges Moraine
 Onondaga Escarpment

References

External links 

 Niagara Escarpment Resource Network 
 Coalition on the Niagara Escarpment
 The Niagara Escarpment: Wisconsin's eighth natural wonder
 The Niagara Escarpment Legacy Project

 
Geology of the United States
Geological history of the Great Lakes
Stratigraphy of Ontario
Landforms of Niagara County, New York
Escarpments of Canada
Escarpments of the United States
Golden Horseshoe
Biosphere reserves of Canada
Niagara Falls
Landforms of Ontario